The Syracuse Football All-Century Team features the top 44 football players from the 20th century at Syracuse University. The team features a Heisman Trophy winner, nine members of the College Football Hall of Fame, and seven other members of the Pro Football Hall of Fame.

The All-Century Team includes players from eight different decades. The criteria for selecting the team included all players who significantly impacted Syracuse football with special consideration for those who were either members of the Hall of Fame, were named as All-Americans, or who had played in the NFL. Nominees for the ballot were selected by the prominent figures associated with the Syracuse University football program.

See also 
 Syracuse University
 Syracuse Orange football team

References 

Syracuse Orange football